Sarsaina or Sarsena is a village in Weir Tehsil of Bharatpur District in Rajasthan
 It is located near Halena at Jaipur- Agra National Highway 21
 According to Census 2011 Sarsena has the population of 5090 with about 900 families
 Male: 2708 and Female: 2382
 Total geographical area is 1024.66 hectares

Religious view 
Hindus are in majority in this village. There are several temples in this village. A few of them are :
Angadiya Mandir, Dedicated to Shri Hanuman ji 
Jugalkishor ji  Mandir, Dedicated to Shri Radha Krishna ji
Devnarayan Mandir, Dedicated to folk God Shri Devnarayan ji

Venerable Persons
Mr. Shrikant Sharma ( Ex Sarpanch and Co-operative Bank Chairman)
Mr. Balram singh Sinsinwar ( Rtd. Govt Teacher and Social Worker)
Mr. Suresh singh PTI ( Rtd. Govt Teacher and Social Worker)
Mr. Muninder singh ( Inspector Raj Police)
Mr. Vinod Sharma (Inspector Raj Police)
Mr. Harendra Singh ( MCPO Indian Navy)
Mr. Rajveer Sarsena PA (ex niji sachiv) HH Maharaj shree vishvendra singh Cabinet minister Rajasthan govt.

Geographical view 

 It is arranged 16 km away from Tehsil Weir and 41 km away from District headquarter Bharatpur. According to 2011 details, Sarsaina or Sarsena village is additionally a gram panchayat.
 The complete topographical territory of village is 1024.66 hectares. There are around 900 houses in Sarsaina. According to 2019 details, Sarsena goes under Weir tehsil and Bharatpur parliamentary voting demographic. Nadbai is the closest town to Sarsena which is roughly 12 km away.

Educational View 

 In  the term of education , this village has 3 Govt primary and one higher secondary school as well. There are also two higher secondary private schools. This village produces teachers, doctors, engineers, clerks every year. In average there is at least one govt teacher in each house. Sarsaina is the second largest village in Bharatpur district in the terms of Government teachers. There is also a B.ed college i.e. DPM at Halena road.
 Sarsena village has its own GSS ( Grid Sub Station) and PHC (Primary Healthcare Center). There is also a Bank i.e. Baroda Rajasthan Kshetriya Gramin Bank and a post office also.
Sarsaina or Sarsena has two cemeteries (मोक्षधाम). One is located at main bus stand and another is at Pili road.

Political View 

 Sarpanch: Ms. Renu Foujdar
 MLA:         Mr. Bhajan Lal Jatav (Weir)
 MP :          Mrs. Ranjita Koli (Bharatpur)

Villages in Bharatpur district